Lisa Mary Neville (born 27 May 1964) is a former Australian politician, formerly serving as the member for Bellarine in the Victorian Legislative Assembly. She represented the Labor Party. Between 2014 and 2022, she was the Minister for Police and Minister for Water. She also held other portfolios such as environment, climate Change and emergency services at different times during this period.

Early life and education
Neville was born in Newcastle, New South Wales. Her father worked for the airline Qantas, and the family moved around Australia and Papua New Guinea before settling in Brisbane. Neville attended Mount Alvernia College, and then completed an arts degree at Griffith University. At university, she was involved in student unionism, initially with the Queensland Union of Students and then as general secretary and president of the National Union of Students in Melbourne. She worked as a community visitor, inspecting residential facilities for the elderly and disabled on behalf of the state Public Advocate.

Political career
Neville first entered parliament at the 2002 election winning the marginal Liberal seat of Bellarine.  After spending her first term on the backbench, she was promoted to the position of Minister for Mental Health, Minister for Children and Minister for Aged Care after the 2006 election. 

Neville was named as the Shadow Minister for Environment, Climate Change and the Arts by leader Daniel Andrews following Labor's loss in the 2010 Victorian state election. 

Neville was made Minister for Environment and Climate Change and Minister for Water following the 2014 Victorian state election.

Following a cabinet reshuffle in May 2016 Lisa Neville was appointed as the first female Minister for Police in Victoria, and retained her water portfolio.

In February 2021, Neville was admitted to hospital and was forced to take leave due to Chron's disease. She returned to work in August 2021. The nature of her emergency services portfolio required regular travel around to remote parts of the state at short notice, which was not suitable with her medical condition, forcing her to relinquish the portfolio.

In June 2022, Neville announced she would retire at the November state election, citing her Chron's disease medical condition. She stepped down from her ministerial roles on 27 June 2022, and her term as member for Bellarine ended on 26 November 2022.

Personal life
Neville was previously married to, and has a son with, Richard Marles, who later became the federal MP for Corio and the Deputy Prime Minister.

References

External links
 Parliamentary voting record of Lisa Neville at Victorian Parliament Tracker
 

1964 births
Living people
Australian Labor Party members of the Parliament of Victoria
Members of the Victorian Legislative Assembly
Victorian Ministers for the Environment
Griffith University alumni
Deakin University alumni
21st-century Australian politicians
21st-century Australian women politicians
Women members of the Victorian Legislative Assembly
Labor Right politicians
Politicians from Brisbane